The Under Secretary of Energy for Infrastructure, previously the Undersecretary for Energy, is a position within the United States Department of Energy. The under secretary oversees the department's energy and environment programs, including environmental cleanup of the nuclear weapons complex, nuclear waste management efforts, and applied energy research and developmental activities.

The Under Secretary of Energy for Infrastructure is appointed by the President with the advice and consent of the Senate. The Under Secretary is paid at level III of the Executive Schedule, meaning they receives a basic annual salary of $152,000 as of 2006. Previous Under Secretaries by recency include Acting Under Secretary David B. Sandalow, Under Secretary Bud Albright, who was confirmed on September 3, 2007. Acting Under Secretary Bill Ostendorff, Acting Under Secretary Dennis Spurgeon, David K. Garman, and Robert G. Card.

References